Guillermo Vilas defeated José Luis Clerc 6–1, 6–2, 6–1 to win the 1979 ATP Buenos Aires singles competition. José Luis Clerc was the defending champion.

Seeds
A champion seed is indicated in bold text while text in italics indicates the round in which that seed was eliminated.

  Guillermo Vilas (champion)
  José Higueras (quarterfinals)
  Víctor Pecci, Sr. (first round)
  Eddie Dibbs (semifinals)
  Hans Gildemeister (second round)
  José Luis Clerc (final)
  Ivan Lendl (semifinals)
  Tomáš Šmíd (quarterfinals)

Draw

Key
 Q - Qualifier
 NB: All rounds up to but not including the final were the best of 3 sets. The final was the best of 5 sets.

Final

Section 1

Section 2

External links
 Main draw

Singles
1979 in Argentine tennis